Eric Rockwell (born October 30, 1996) is an American racing driver who currently competes for Rockwell Autosport Development in the TCR class of the Michelin Pilot Challenge.

Career

Early career 
Rockwell began his racing carer in 2015, competing in SCCA club racing events in touring categories. He would then move to the ChampCar Endurance Series for 2016.

IMSA 
For the 2021 season, Rockwell made his professional debut at Watkins Glen International in the 2021 Michelin Pilot Challenge. He would finish 9th. He would contest two other races that season at Virginia International Raceway and Road Atlanta, finishing 8th and 9th respectively.

To begin the 2022 season the Rockwell Autosport Development team partnered with Oldcastle Materials running under the name Belgard & Techniseal Racing, with Rockwell being named as one of the drivers in the 2022 Michelin Pilot Challenge. The season would prove to be a break out year for Rockwell, grabbing his first podium at Weathertech Raceway Laguna Seca along side co-driver Denis Dupont. He would go on to finish 13th in the drivers standings. 

In late 2022, it was announced Rockwell Autosport Development would be returning to the 2023 Michelin Pilot Challenge with a two car entry. Rockwell was announced to drive an unknown number of races.

Personal life 
Rockwell is a graduate of Rowan University and Is currently studying dentistry at Maurice H. Kornberg School of Dentistry.

Racing record

Career summary

References

External links 
Eric Rockwell career summary at DriverDB.com

1996 births
American racing drivers
Living people
Michelin Pilot Challenge drivers
People from Long Branch, New Jersey